Randia can refer to :

 Randia (bird), a monotypic genus of bird containing a single species, Randia pseudozosterops, also known as Rand's warbler
 Randia (plant), a genus of plants of the family Rubiaceae

 r/India, a subreddit on the social site Reddit.

See also 
 Randhia, a village and former princely state in Kathiawar, Gujarat, India